Anisolepis longicauda is a species of lizard in the family  Leiosauridae. It is native to Brazil, Argentina, and Paraguay.

References

Anisolepis
Reptiles described in 1891
Reptiles of Brazil
Reptiles of Argentina
Reptiles of Paraguay
Taxa named by George Albert Boulenger